The Lost Highway Tour was a worldwide concert tour by American rock band Bon Jovi in support of their 10th studio album, Lost Highway. It took place from October 2007 to July 2008. Originally planned as a 2008 greatest hits tour, the tour was changed to promote Lost Highway after the album's worldwide success, reaching No. 1 in several countries when released in June 2007.

Immediately after the album's release, the band performed a string of promotional summer concerts in the United States, Canada, Puerto Rico, United Kingdom and Japan. The tour began proper in October 2007 with ten concerts that would mark the opening of New Jersey's Prudential Center, before doing a tour of Canada and then tours of Japan, Australasia, the United States and Europe in 2008. Bon Jovi also played their first concert in New Zealand in 12 years as part of the tour.

The Lost Highway Tour is a finalist for the Billboard 2008 Touring Awards for Top Tour, Top Draw, and Top Manager.

Background
During the opening concert in Prudential Center in Newark, New Jersey on October 25, 2007, Jon Bon Jovi announced that the band was starting a world tour with 10 shows in Prudential Center. The next day, record company Island confirmed through official press release on their web site Jon's statement and also announcing that band will visit Canada, United States, Japan, New Zealand, England, Ireland, Scotland, Germany, the Netherlands, Austria, among other countries. Label also announced dates for Canadian, Japanese and United States concerts on same day. Jon's world tour announcement, interview and concert footage was available for free to the media to download at 12:01 AM EST on Friday, October 26, 2007, through Bon Jovi's profile on The NewsMarket's official website. To mark the launch of the world tour, video album Lost Highway: The Concert (2007) was screened in over 100 movie theaters for one night only on November 6, 2007. MaxMouth has partnered with AEG Live to produce the premier Web TV series "On the Road with Bon Jovi" and filmed all Bon Jovi concerts in Prudential Center in Newark from October 25 to November 11, 2007. They released five webisodes that premiered independently on several biggest web portals, including maxmouth.com. "On the Road with Bon Jovi" also included exclusive interviews and performances by My Chemical Romance, Big & Rich, Gretchen Wilson, Daughtry and All American Rejects, who appeared as supporting acts during 10 night stands. Once each webisode premiered, it was reverted to Bon Jovi's official website and remained inside custom co-branded MaxMouth & Bon Jovi video player.

Bon Jovi also performed for the first time in Australia since 1995. Tickets for Australian concerts went on sale in morning of November 15, 2007, and tickets for Sydney and Melbourne were sold in couple of minutes. Due to the overwhelming demand, second and final show was added at Sydney's Acer Arena on January 22, 2008. Since three concerts at Air Canada Centre on December 6, 2007, December 7, 2007, and March 10, 2008, quickly sold out, Bon Jovi also added a fourth concert for March 12, 2008 and fifth for March 13, 2008, making them the first act to ever play five concerts on the same tour at Air Canada Centre.

Tour highlights
The Lost Highway Tour has seen the band perform songs rarely heard live since the These Days Tour, for example "Hey God", "I Believe", "Lie to Me", "This Ain't a Love Song" and "Always" in its original version. At several of the band's summer stadium shows, the band was known to play extremely long setlists, some of them running nearly three hours, totaling approximately 26 songs, including encores that sometimes had as much as seven songs.

The band also spontaneously played "Stick to Your Guns", from the New Jersey album for the first time in twenty years at the Amsterdam gig, after Jon Bon Jovi noticed seventeen banners held up in the front row with the lyrics to the song printed on them.
The band played at Rock in Rio in Lisbon on May 31, 2008, making it their first concert in Portugal since 1995. The band played a free concert in Central Park, New York City, to 60,000 fans in conjunction with Major League Baseball and Bank of America, as part of MLB All Star Game week.

Lead guitarist Richie Sambora took the lead for one song at most shows with either "I'll Be There for You", "These Days" and occasionally "Stranger in This Town". Keyboardist David Bryan also sang solo very rarely with "In These Arms", on which rhythm guitarist Bobby Bandiera also took the lead guitar solo.

Bon Jovi have also performed "Dry County" frequently.

It has also been announced both during concert and on the official band website that a live DVD from the last two nights of the tour at Madison Square Garden will be released.

Before the band was set to perform at the Bank Atlantic Center in Fort Lauderdale, Florida, there was a bomb threat at the stadium. The band finally took the stage at about 9:00 p.m.

A fan jumped on top of Jon at the concert at Punchestown in Ireland just before the bridge of "In These Arms", and it took four security guards to take her off.

Set list
 Lost Highway
 Born to Be My Baby
 You Give Love a Bad Name
 Summertime
 Raise Your Hands
 Runaway
 I'll Sleep When I'm Dead/Jumpin' Jack Flash
 Whole Lot of Leavin'
 In These Arms
 Any Other Day
 We Got It Going On
 It's My Life
 Keep the Faith
 I'll Be There for You (Richie Sambora on lead vocals)
 (You Want To) Make a Memory
 Someday I'll Be Saturday Night
 Blaze of Glory
 Who Says You Can't Go Home
 Have a Nice Day
 Bad Medicine/Shout
 Livin' on a Prayer
Encore:
 Hallelujah
 Wanted Dead or Alive
 I Love This Town

Personnel
Bon Jovi
Jon Bon Jovi – lead vocals, acoustic guitar, rhythm guitar, maracas, tambourine
Richie Sambora – lead guitar, backing vocals, talk box, lead vocals on "I'll Be There For You"
Hugh McDonald – bass guitar, backing vocals
Tico Torres – drums, percussion 
David Bryan – keyboards, backing vocals

Additional personnel
Bobby Bandiera – rhythm guitar, backing vocals
Lorenza Ponce – violin, viola, tambourine, backing vocals
Kurt Johnston – pedal steel guitar, banjo, mandolin, Dobro, backing vocals

Tour grossings
The first 22 shows grossed 41.4 million dollars, placing their tour at No. 11 on the list for top-grossing tours of 2007. The band's second North American leg of 38 shows grossed $56.3 million in ticket sales according to Pollstar making it the number one concert draw in North America for the first half of 2008. Bon Jovi's 10-night run to open the new Prudential Center in Newark, New Jersey was the No. 1 Grossing event in 2007 and the No. 6 Grossing event "of all time" in North America. The band's 5-night stand at Toronto's Air Canada Centre set the record for the most number of shows in one tour at that venue, beating the previous record of 4 held by the band, as well as U2, The Spice Girls, and The Police. The third leg of the tour the band played to over 966,000 fans. On the fourth leg of Europe they played to over 1 million concert goers in 22 shows. The combined gross of the tour's first, second and third legs was $129 million, with $16.4 million from the Newark shows and $112.4 million from the remaining shows placing them first on Billboards midyear touring chart.

The tour was the highest-grossing tour of 2008 in Billboard's rankings. The tour grossed $210,650,974 and sold 2,157,675 tickets in total. In Pollstar's calculus for North America, the Lost Highway Tour had the fifth-highest gross for 2008 at $70.4 million.

Supporting acts
For the run at the Prudential Center in New Jersey, the support acts were My Chemical Romance, Big & Rich, Gretchen Wilson, Daughtry, and The All-American Rejects, with each support act playing two of the ten dates. Hedley opened for Bon Jovi during the Canadian leg of the tour, forcing them to postpone their headlining Canadian tour until early 2008. Daughtry opened for Bon Jovi during the second North American leg of the tour. The Feeling supported Bon Jovi at four of the summer dates in the United Kingdom, with Biffy Clyro supporting on the first night at Twickenham. Kid Rock and Razorlight opened for Bon Jovi at Punchestown, Ireland, with local Irish band DC Tempest. Switchblade opened for Bon Jovi in Bristol, UK. In Australia, local bands Front Counter (Melbourne), OohLaLa (Sydney), and The Violet Flames (Perth) won the support slot through a radio contest. New Zealand band The Valves were the support act in Christchurch

Tour dates

This concert was for the MLB All Star Game"
|}

See also 
 List of highest-grossing concert tours

References

External links
 Official tour website

Bon Jovi concert tours
2007 concert tours
2008 concert tours